Yuriy Oleksandrovych Kamelchuk (born 12 February 1980) is a Ukrainian politician who represents the Servant of the People party in the Verkhovna Rada (Ukraine's parliament).

Biography 
He graduated from the journalism faculty of Ivan Franko National University of Lviv, and studied business experience and public space management in Singapore, Israel, Sweden, Poland and Spain.

He got a master's degree at Taras Shevchenko National University of Kyiv on the specialty of ‘Public Management and Administration’ in 2021.

Parliament activity 
In 2019 parliamentary elections was a candidate for people's deputies from the political party ‘Servant of the People’ in the 125th electoral district. As a result, won the election with 16,5% of the votes.
Date of gaining deputy's authority: August 2019.
Member of the Verkhovna Rada of Ukraine Committee on Energy, Housing and Utilities Services.
Alternative member of the Permanent Delegation in Parliamentary Assembly of the Council of Europe.
On 12 December 2019 joined inter-faction group ‘Humanna kraina’ established at the initiative of UAnimals to promote humanistic values and protect animals from cruelty.

References

1980 births
Living people
Ninth convocation members of the Verkhovna Rada
Servant of the People (political party) politicians
21st-century Ukrainian politicians